In Greek mythology, Eurypylus  (Ancient Greek: Εὐρύπυλος Eurypylos) was a son of Poseidon and the Pleiad Celaeno, and together with his brother Lycus, they ruled over the Fortunate Islands. Others state that Eurypylus was a king of Cyrene, and note that the brothers were also referred to as Eurytus and Lycaon. Eurypylus married Sterope, a daughter of Helios and had two sons, Lycaon and Leucippus. Triton assumed his shape when he encountered the Argonauts in Libya. This Eurypylus must not be confused with another son of Poseidon named Eurypylus, king of Cos.

Notes 

Kings in Greek mythology
Children of Poseidon

References 

 Apollodorus, The Library with an English Translation by Sir James George Frazer, F.B.A., F.R.S. in 2 Volumes, Cambridge, MA, Harvard University Press; London, William Heinemann Ltd. 1921. ISBN 0-674-99135-4. Online version at the Perseus Digital Library. Greek text available from the same website.
 Apollonius Rhodius, Argonautica translated by Robert Cooper Seaton (1853-1915), R. C. Loeb Classical Library Volume 001. London, William Heinemann Ltd, 1912. Online version at the Topos Text Project.
 Apollonius Rhodius, Argonautica. George W. Mooney. London. Longmans, Green. 1912. Greek text available at the Perseus Digital Library.
 Pindar, Odes translated by Diane Arnson Svarlien. 1990. Online version at the Perseus Digital Library.
 Pindar, The Odes of Pindar including the Principal Fragments with an Introduction and an English Translation by Sir John Sandys, Litt.D., FBA. Cambridge, MA., Harvard University Press; London, William Heinemann Ltd. 1937. Greek text available at the Perseus Digital Library.

Demigods in classical mythology